Panorama Express, abbreviated PE, is a special category of long-distance train in Switzerland. It was introduced with the December 2019 timetable change, and is generally used to denote tourism-focused services. Examples of such trains include the Bernina Express, Glacier Express, and Voralpen Express. Characteristics of a Panorama Express can include first- and second-class seating, air-conditioned coaches, and a limited number of intermediate stops. Advance reservations are often required but not necessarily compulsory.

References 

Passenger rail transport in Switzerland